247 °F is a horror film directed by Levan Bakhia and Beqa Jguburia. Cast members include Scout Taylor-Compton, Christina Ulloa, Travis Van Winkle, Michael Copon  and Tyler Mane. It was filmed in Tbilisi, Georgia and finished filming by July, 2011. It received its first international release date in Georgia on 1 September 2011. The film is about a group of friends who get trapped in a sauna.

Plot
Jenna (Scout Taylor-Compton) gets into a car accident with her boyfriend, Jamie, who eventually dies. Three years later, while coping with her past tragedy, Jenna is invited to stay for the weekend in a lakeside cabin with her best friend Renee (Christina Ulloa). They are joined by Renee’s irresponsible boyfriend, Michael (Michael Copon), and his friend, Ian (Travis Van Winkle), and sail off at Ian's uncle, Wade's (Tyler Mane) lakeside cabin. They are greeted by Wade along with his friendly dog, named Beau. They settle in the cabin and plan on attending a party, since there is a festival happening around the nearby town at night. Jenna goes to her room and refuses to take her pills so she could have fun with her friends. While they all eat dinner, Wade mentions how he may not be around while they are away since he has work to do. The group gets fascinated when they stumble inside a sauna Wade built. While they enjoy spending time inside, the temperature gets warmer and they decide to swim at the lake. Trembling in cold, they all head back inside the sauna. Meanwhile, Michael gets high from the marijuana Wade had given to him, where Renee rebuffs his sexual advances. This upsets Michael and he decides not to follow the others into the sauna, while clumsily knocking things over. As the temperature continues to rise, Renee ultimately decides to leave but the door is blocked from the outside. The trio think it is just one of Michael's pranks since they all know he's mad at Renee, which they don't find amusing. They soon realize that they are trapped in the sauna and attempts to break a small window on the door, injuring Ian's hand. They all take turns gasping for air as the temperature raises even higher with another unsuccessful attempt to unblock the door from the outside. The group then finds a hidden controller which they all can't risk destroying, since Ian believes it would just alter the temperature.

Meanwhile, Wade is seen handling the fireworks for the festival with another guy, when Beau tracks the trio's scream, begging for help, from the back of the house. Michael shows up at Wade's and both disregard Beau's barking. Michael clearly thinks the three left him and attended the party, since he couldn't help himself from getting high. The two hang out and start a conversation as Michael explains that he wasn't permitted to catch up at the party with the group since he didn't have a ticket and returned home.

Back at the sauna, the situation escalates as the group runs out of water to drink and Renee gets sick from the temperature. Renee ultimately decides to break the controller, thinking it would lower down the temperature, but is stopped by Jenna who inadvertently strikes her head, leaving her unconscious. Jenna starts freaking out and decides to break the controller herself, which does in fact increase the heat as Ian feared. Ian becomes hysterical and burns himself badly in an attempt to prevent the steamer from heating the room out of control. He breaks it and the steamer blows up, killing him. The explosion seemingly frees the door and Jenna steps out in shock and wanders the house, before she wakes from unconsciousness realizing she is still trapped in the sauna. She finds Renee alive and lets her near the window to breathe as Jenna herself goes unconscious as well from the escaping natural gas which she manages to plug just in time.

Michael returns to the cabin where flashbacks shows him absentmindedly knocking over wooden steps and setting them against the door. It is revealed that the steps fall into place against a raised floor by the occupants as they talk and move the door themselves. Meanwhile, Wade arrives at the cabin and discovers the two girls, alive and calls the paramedics who take Jenna and Renee away on stretchers as they hold hands.

Cast
 Scout Taylor-Compton as Jenna
 Christina Ulloa as Renee
 Travis Van Winkle as Ian
 Michael Copon as Michael
 Tyler Mane as Wade

Home release
247°F was released on DVD and Blu-ray in the U.S. on October 23, 2012, from Anchor Bay Entertainment.

References

External links
 

2011 films
2011 horror thriller films
American survival films
2010s survival films
2010s English-language films
Horror thriller films from Georgia (country)
American horror thriller films
English-language films from Georgia (country)
2010s American films